Salome with the Head of John the Baptist may refer to:

 Salome with the Head of John the Baptist (Caravaggio, London)
 Salome with the Head of John the Baptist (Caravaggio, Madrid)
 Salome with the Head of John the Baptist (Luini)
 Salome with the Head of John the Baptist by Jacob Cornelisz van Oostsanen; see 120 Paintings from the Rijksmuseum
 Salome with the Head of John the Baptist (Sebastiano del Piombo)
 Salome Presented with the Head of John the Baptist (Peter Paul Rubens)
 Salome with the Head of John the Baptist (Stom)

See also 

 Salome (disambiguation)